Amblyeleotris aurora, the pinkbar goby, is a species of goby native to reefs of the western Indian Ocean at depths of from  though usually not deeper than .  It is commensal with the shrimp Alpheus randalli. This species can reach a length of  TL.  It can also be found in the aquarium trade.

References

External links

 Photograph

aurora
Fish described in 1977